Deatrich Wise Jr. (born July 26, 1994) is an American football defensive end for the New England Patriots of the National Football League (NFL). He played college football at Arkansas and was drafted by the Patriots in the fourth round of the 2017 NFL Draft.

College
Wise played college football at for the Arkansas Razorbacks. He accepted an invitation to play in the 2017 East–West Shrine Game. Wise recorded eight combined tackles, 1.5 sacks, four quarterback pressures, and a forced fumble during their 10–3 victory over the East. His dominant performance and game-high eight tackles raised his draft stock with multiple draft experts reporting his rise up draft boards. He was one of 59 defensive linemen invited to the NFL Scouting Combine in Indianapolis, Indiana. On March 15, 2017, he opted to participate at Arkansas' Pro Day.

Professional career
The New England Patriots selected Wise in the fourth round (131st overall) of the 2017 NFL Draft. On May 18, 2017, the New England Patriots signed Wise to a four-year, $2.97 million contract that includes a signing bonus of $575,883.

He recorded his first career sack against the Chiefs in his first career NFL game. Wise finished his rookie season with 26 tackles and 5 sacks. In the playoffs, the Patriots defeated the Tennessee Titans in the Divisional Round with Wise recording 2 sacks. The Patriots then went on to defeat the Jacksonville Jaguars in the AFC Championship Game to advance to Super Bowl LII where they would go on to lose 33–41 to the Philadelphia Eagles.

Wise finished 2018 season with 30 tackles (15 solo) and 4.5 sacks. Wise helped the Patriots reach Super Bowl LIII where they beat the Los Angeles Rams 13–3.

In Week 3 of the 2020 season against the Las Vegas Raiders, Wise strip sacked Derek Carr and recovered the football in the end zone for his first career touchdown during the 36–20 win.

On March 19, 2021, Wise re-signed with the Patriots on a four-year, $22 million deal.

Wise had a career year in 2022, starting 16 games, recording a career-high 7.5 sacks and 59 tackles.

Personal life
His father, Deatrich Sr., also played football. His younger brother, Daniel, plays for the Washington Commanders. His mother, Shiela Wise, served 22 years as a nurse in the US Army.

References

External links
Arkansas Razorbacks bio

1994 births
Living people
American football defensive ends
Arkansas Razorbacks football players
New England Patriots players
People from Carrollton, Texas
Players of American football from Texas
Sportspeople from the Dallas–Fort Worth metroplex